Melodie ("Melody") is the second studio album by German rapper Cro. It was released on 6 July 2014 by the hip-hop label Chimperator Productions in both a standard and deluxe edition. The album debuted at No. 1 on the German, Austrian, and Swiss album charts.

Reception
Melodie rose to popularity after being released in the 26th week of 2014, rising to 1st place in the German charts. Overall, the album spent eight weeks in the top 10. In Austria and Switzerland, the album immediately placed at the top of the charts.

In Germany, the song held the number 1 spot for four weeks. Hey Girl, the third and last single reached number 35.

Charts

Weekly charts

Year-end charts

References

2014 albums
Cro (rapper) albums
German-language albums